Niidiküla is a village in Hiiumaa Parish, Hiiu County in northwestern Estonia.

According to the 2000 census, the population of Niidiküla was 18.

References

External links
 Map at nona.net

Villages in Hiiu County